La mujer perfecta (English title: The Perfect Woman) is a Venezuelan telenovela created by Leonardo Padrón and produced by Venevisión.

Mónica Spear and Ricardo Álamo star as the main protagonists with Ana Karina Manco and Jean Carlo Simancas playing the main antagonists. Marlene De Andrade, Marisa Román, Flavia Gleske and Mariaca Semprúm star as co-protagonists.

Story
This is a story about six women who will go to great lengths in order to become every man's desire: the perfect woman. Micaela Gómez (Monica Spear) is a peculiar girl who has never fallen in love, until she becomes a personal assistant of the best plastic surgeon in the country, Santiago Reverón (Ricardo Álamo). Micaela has a form of autism called Asperger syndrome, and as a result, people around her do not understand her and confuse her as a crazy person. The arrival of Micaela to Infinito, the esthetic centre, will disturb Santiago, who is well known as Dr. Botox. Santiago is married to Gala Moncada (Ana Karina Manco) an acting mythical diva, and one of the most desired women in the country. She stands out as Santiago's best work, and she is almost perfect. But the years begin to harass her, and she turns more compulsive and obsessive when she realises that her career is fading away and that her husband has set his eyes on a woman of unusual characteristics.

Eva Gómez (Marlene De Andrade) is Micaela's older sister who works as an instructor at a modelling academy teaching other women how to be beautiful. In the past, Eva participated in Miss Venezuela but did not even make it to the finalists. Happily married to Nené López, a national football star, her life changes when she meets Cruz Mario Polanco, a business magnate who decides to conquer her, arguing that all women have a  price. Polanco lures Eva using his riches and power, and works to separate her from Nené.

Lucía Reverón (Marisa Roman) is Santiago's sister. She tells everyone she wants to be a model, and even registers for classes at an acting academy, but she has hidden motives. One day she meets a man who is three times senior to her: Guillermo Toro, a brilliant psychologist who often treats patients with addiction to cosmetic surgery. To their surprise, they fall in love with each other fiercely. The problem is not only the enormous difference in age that brings scandal in their friendships, but this man was the great love of her mother 25 years ago; her passion was hidden and buried. When Maruja Reverón, her mother, meets again with Guillermo, she will want to recover this love. But this time the opponent will be her own daughter.

Carolina Toro (Flavia Gleske) is Guillermo's daughter, who is obsessed with becoming a fashion model, and goes through diets and weight loss pills in order to be perfect. She is married to Beto, who works as Polanco's bodyguard. But after crossing paths with Daniel Sanabria, a plastic surgeon working at Infinito, they begin a fierce love affair. The only problem is he is the husband of Renata Volcán, the  owner of the modelling academy where she studies.

Shirley, whom everyone refers to as La popular Shirley (Mariaca Semprún) is Micaela and Eva's sister, dreams of becoming famous, and enrolls at the modeling academy to achieve fame. But her poor talent has relegated her to the most anonymous of jobs: extra. Her unscrupulous aunt tries unsuccessfully to place her in all possible castings, movies and telenovelas, until she decides to venture her into another profession where she can become a queen: the world of the escort service girls. It is a pity that love hides in the modest shoes of Lucho Montilla, a charismatic Professor of Arts in Oratory, to whom she has declared hatred at first sight.

Cast

Main cast 
Mónica Spear as Micaela Gómez
Ricardo Álamo as Santiago Reverón
Ana Karina Manco as Gala Moncada
Eduardo Orozco as Larry Corona
Marlene De Andrade as Eva Gómez
Manuel Sosa as Javier "El Nené" López
Marisa Román as Lucía Reverón
Flavia Gleske as Carolina Toro
Jean Carlo Simancas as Crúz Mario Polanco
Mariaca Semprún as Shirley Gómez
Albi De Abreu as Lucho Montilla
Guillermo García as Daniel Sanabria
Eduardo Serrano as Guillermo Toro

Also main cast 

Alba Roversi as Minerva León
Carolina Perpetuo as Renata Volcán
Ana María Simón as Karla Troconis
Jerónimo Gil as Beto Pimentel
Elba Escobar as Estrella Valdés
Julie Restifo as Antonella Montiel
Beatriz Valdés as Maruja Reverón
Gustavo Rodríguez as Saturno Luna
Milena Santander as Presentación Gómez
Héctor Manrique as Willie Troconis 
Manuel Salazar as Rolando Gómez
Andreína Yépez as Bambi Valladares
Alejandro Corona as Tarzán Valladares
Claudia La Gatta as Isabella Andrade
Carlos Arráiz as Marlon Pájaro
Magaly Serrano as Keyla

Recurring cast 

Martin Peyrou as Emerson Hinojosa
Anabela Troconis
Jesús Nunes as Quintín
Sandra Yajure as Celina
Grecia Augusta
Alicia Hernández
Mayela Cáldera
Yuvanna Montalvo as Chantal
María Alesia Machado
Kristel Krause
Lili Tarabella as Daniela Corona Troconis

Guest actors 

Marco Antonio Alcalá as Jorge Sánchez
Rafael Romero as Comisario Pereira
Laureano Olivares as Yerson
Hernán Iturbe as Jefe de mesoneros
Marcos Moreno as DT del equipo de fútbol
Ligia Duarte as Madre de Karla
Cristhian González as Hermano de Lucho
Mario Sudano as Toribio "El Gran Tsunami"
Guillermo Pérez as Rubén
Edgard Serrano as Comisario Perales
Miguel Gutierrez as El malandro Ramón
José Madonía as Dr. Augusto Linares
Esmeralda Yaniche as Modelo
Flory Diez as Model
Pedro Pablo Porras as Ricardo
Esperanza Magaz as Olga Diaz
Rosalinda Serfaty as Raquel Rojas
Daniela Bascopé as Arelis
Maricarmen Sobrino as Herself
Roque Valero as Himself
Daniela Alvarado as Herself
Osmel Sousa as Himself
Leonardo Villalobos as Himself
Hany Kauam as Himself
Santiago Cruz as Himself
Gilberto Santa Rosa as Himself
Mimí Lazo as Herself
Catherine Fulop as Herself
Hilda Abrahamz as Herself
Damián Genovese as Himself / Cirilo
Abril Schreiber as Herself
Luis David Díaz as Himself
Tania Sarabia as Herself
Giselle Reyes as Herself
Carmen Julia Álvarez as Herself
Yordano as Himself
Cuarto Poder as Himself

References

External links

Venezuelan telenovelas
2010 telenovelas
2010 Venezuelan television series debuts
2011 Venezuelan television series endings
Spanish-language telenovelas
Venevisión telenovelas
Autism in television
Television shows set in Caracas